Oryzias dancena or the Indian ricefish are a freshwater–brackish fish species native to the India, Bangladesh, Sri Lanka, Myanmar and Thailand. Their maximum length is only . They are normally found in brackish habitats near the coast, but it lives in fresh water as well. It is not considered threatened. This species was described as Cyprinus dancena by Francis Buchanan-Hamilton in 1822 with the type locality given as "Estuary below Calcutta".

References

dancena
Freshwater fish of Sri Lanka
Taxa named by Francis Buchanan-Hamilton
Fish described in 1822